The Ukrainian Sea Guard (full name ) is the coast guard service of Ukraine, subordinated to its Border Guard Service.

The Sea Guard is the local successor of the Soviet Border Troops Naval Units that were similarly responsible for coast guard tasks. However, there were some interchanges in units, ships and personnel between the Sea Guard and the Ukrainian Navy.

Service personnel of the Sea Guard wear either a black uniform similar to the Ukrainian Navy, but decorated with some green elements (traditional for border guard), or a common uniform of the Border Guard Service. Sea Guard vessels bear the Морська охорона inscription on their boards.

Organization
The Sea Guard operates four sea guard detachments: in Balaklava, Odesa, Izmail and Kerch; a sea guard cutters division in Mariupol; a special-purpose sea guard cutters division in Yalta; and a riverine Dnieper sea guard cutters division in Kyiv. Sea guard administration is split between the Azov-Black seas regional administration in Simferopol and the Southern regional administration in Odesa.

Squads of Marine Security
 Kerch Squad of Marine Security (from the Cape of Mehanom across the strait of Kerch and the Sea of Azov to administrative border between Zaporizhia and Donetsk regions)
 Yalta Squad of Marine Security (special assignment)
 Sevastopol Squad of Marine Security (Main base in Balaklava)
 Odesa Squad of Marine Security (Southern regional administration)

Battle fleet
Major vessels.

Prospective additions

Decommissioned, sold, destroyed, captured

Future
From 2012 to 2014 there were plans to build 39 small guard ships of different classes, including 6 Koral-class and 8 Orlan-class vessels. From 2015 onward, there are plans to build a multipurpose guard ship, with displacement around 1000 tons, which can carry one helicopter.

Notes

References

External links

 Sea Guard page on the official site of Border Guard Service
 Sea Guard of the State Border Service of Ukraine

State Border Guard Service of Ukraine
Coast guards